M. K. Muthu is an Indian actor, singer and politician. Muthu is the eldest son of late former Tamil Nadu chief minister M. Karunanidhi and his first wife Padmavathi, sister of actor-singer Chidambaram S. Jayaraman. According to the internal evidence provided by Karunanidhi, in the 1st volume of his autobiography, Muthu's birth probably took place on January 14, 1948, Muthu's mother Padmavathi had died at the age of 20, soon after giving birth to Muthu, due to accelerated tuberculosis fever.

Muthu started acting in 1970  and appeared in films such as Pillaiyo Pillai, Samayalkaran, Anayavilaku, Ingeyum Manidhargal and Pookkari. He also sang a few songs in these films. In 2008, he sang a song for the film Mattuthavani under music director Deva. Most of his movies paired with actress Vennira Aadai Nirmala are hit.

Career
Karunanidhi initially had wanted Muthu to be his political heir in the early 1970s, but later launched him into films as a counter to M G Ramachandran, founder of the AIADMK. But Muthu's career in films never really took off.

Muthu later had difference of opinions with Karunanidhi and he went on to join his father's rival party AIADMK. However father and son patched up in 2009 after Muthu fell ill.

Filmography

Sources 
 Hardgrave, Robert L. "Politics and the Film in Tamilnadu: The Stars and the DMK." Asian Survey, Vol. 13, No. 3 (Mar., 1973), pp. 288–305
 Divided dynasties  The Telegraph, Sunday, 20 May 2007
 M.K Muthu returns to tinselville

References

External links

Indian male film actors
1947 births
Karunanidhi family
Living people
Indian actor-politicians
Male actors in Tamil cinema